Richard Michael Patrick (born May 10, 1968) is an American musician, singer and songwriter. He is the frontman for the rock band Filter and a founding member of the supergroups Army of Anyone and The Damning Well, and has served as a touring guitarist for Nine Inch Nails. He is the younger brother of actor Robert Patrick.

Career

Nine Inch Nails
After a chance meeting with Trent Reznor in a Cleveland music store, Patrick landed a gig as touring guitarist in Reznor's live incarnation of Nine Inch Nails from 1989 to 1993. His only recorded contribution can be heard at the end of "Sanctified" on Pretty Hate Machine. Patrick also appeared in the music videos for "Down in It", "Head Like a Hole", "Wish", and one of the two promo videos for "Gave Up" (along with Marilyn Manson), which was filmed in the living room of the infamous house where Sharon Tate was murdered in 1969, as Reznor had leased the house and installed a recording studio in it. Patrick chose to leave the band during the recording of The Downward Spiral in 1993 following a comment from Reznor to "get up off his ass and go write a record" in response to Patrick asking for more money, further suggesting Patrick to work as a delivery driver at a pizzeria.

In September 2022, Patrick joined Nine Inch Nails onstage for a special Rock N' Roll Hall of Fame induction performance, playing classic tracks from his time with the band as well as covering his Filter hit, "Hey Man Nice Shot".

Filter
Before his departure from Nine Inch Nails, Patrick formed his own band, Filter, with Brian Liesegang, who left the band after the recording of the band's first album, 1995's Short Bus. Four years later, Richard Patrick released Filter's second album, Title of Record, with help from guitarist Geno Lenardo.

Filter's third album, The Amalgamut, was released in 2002, with Patrick canceling most of the supporting tour to check into rehab for alcoholism, a problem that had been plaguing him for years.  An experience where he drank on an airplane inspired Filter's hit single "Take a Picture."

After a five-year hiatus, Filter released a fourth record on May 13, 2008, entitled Anthems for the Damned. Patrick did the vocals and the majority of the instrumentation on the album except for the drumming, which was done by Josh Freese. He also worked with Wes Borland and John 5 on a few individual songs.

For the first time in the band's history, the band released an album without a three-to five-year break in between, with their fifth record, The Trouble with Angels, which was released just over two years after Anthems on August 17, 2010. Patrick recorded the album with the Anthems for the Damned touring band, Mikea Fineo, Mitch Marlow, and John Spiker, but recruited a new guitarist (Rob Patterson) and bass player (Phil Buckman) for touring in support of the album.

Patrick returned to the studio in April 2012, to work with producer Bob Marlette and Kill Hannah guitarist, Jonny Radtke, on his next Filter album, under the working title Gurney and the Burning Books. After Filter was signed to Wind-up Records in September 2012, Patrick released his sixth studio album The Sun Comes Out Tonight on June 4, 2013.

In early 2015, Patrick reunited with Ben Grosse, Michael "Blumpy" Tuller, Brian Virtue and former Filter guitarist Brian Liesegang to begin recording Filter's most recent album. After launching a PledgeMusic campaign, Patrick and contributing artists Oumi Kapila, Chris Reeve and Ashley Dzerigian released Filter's seventh studio album Crazy Eyes on April 8, 2016.  

In 2018, Patrick reunited with Brian Liesegang to record a followup to Short Bus entitled Rebus, and funded the project using PledgeMusic. The project remains unreleased due to PledgeMusic going bankrupt. Patrick and Liesegang decided to mount a Title of Record 20th anniversary tour in the Fall of 2019, but the tour was cancelled due to scheduling conflicts with deadlines for film scores that Patrick was working on. In lieu of the Rebus release, Patrick instead plans to release a new Filter album with a different lineup of musicians entitled They Got Us Right Where They Want Us, at Each Other's Throats.

Army of Anyone

While writing songs for Filter's fourth album, Patrick called up the DeLeo brothers of Stone Temple Pilots to help him write a song. The result was a song called "A Better Place." Due to the chemistry the trio had while writing the song, they decided to form a supergroup, which became Army of Anyone.

On September 29, 2005, the formation of Army of Anyone was announced. Along with Dean and Robert DeLeo, future drummer for Korn, Ray Luzier, was also added to the line-up.

Army of Anyone's self-titled debut album was released on November 14, 2006. The album's first single, "Goodbye", peaked at number three on the US Mainstream Rock Tracks chart.

On May 26, 2007, Army of Anyone played their last concert to date in El Paso, Texas. The band has since been on hiatus.

Film composition
Patrick composed the score for Alexandros Avranas's 2016 film Dark Crimes, a crime thriller based on a 2008 David Grann article published in The New Yorker. 
In 2017, Richard and his brother Robert Patrick contributed to the film score of Last Rampage.

Writing
On August 25, 2008, Patrick wrote an editorial, "Talking About War", for the Huffington Post. He has since started writing a column, called Filtering The Truth, for Suicide Girls. His first post, about politics and religion, was posted on Election Day 2008.

Personal life
Patrick and his wife Tina have a daughter, born in 2008, and a son, born in 2009. Patrick graduated from Bay High School in Bay Village, Ohio in 1987. After years of alcohol and drug abuse issues, he has been sober since September 2002.

Patrick's older brother is actor Robert Patrick. He is of Scottish-Irish and English ancestry.

Discography

With Filter

With Nine Inch Nails
Pretty Hate Machine (1989)

With Army of Anyone
Army of Anyone (2006)

Other collaborations

 Richard contributed with The Crystal Method to the song "(Can't You) Trip Like I Do" from the original soundtrack of the 1997 film Spawn; this song also appears in the 1997 album Vegas of The Crystal Method, but Richard's vocal contribution is not on the album version.
 Richard contributed guitar to the soundtrack of the 2008 film Repo! The Genetic Opera.
 Richard is friends with Lacey Mosley, former frontwoman of Flyleaf, and covered the U2 song "Pride (In the Name of Love)" with her while on tour.
 Richard also discovered the band Dualesc and co-produced their 2002 album titled Through The Floods, Not With Them at his Chicago studio.

References

External links

 

1968 births
Alternative rock guitarists
20th-century American singers
21st-century American singers
American atheists
American industrial musicians
American male singers
American rock guitarists
American male guitarists
American rock singers
American people of English descent
American people of Scotch-Irish descent
Filter (band) members
Living people
Singers from Massachusetts
Nine Inch Nails members
People from Needham, Massachusetts
Guitarists from Massachusetts
20th-century American guitarists
Alternative metal guitarists
Army of Anyone members
The Damning Well members
Industrial metal musicians